Minivan (sometimes called simply as van) is a  car classification for vehicles designed to transport passengers in the rear seating row(s), with reconfigurable seats in two or three rows. The equivalent classification in Europe is MPV (multi-purpose vehicle). In Southeast Asia, the equivalent classification is Asian Utility Vehicle (AUV).

Minivans often have a 'one-box' or 'two-box' body configuration, a higher roof, a flat floor, sliding doors for rear passengers, and high H-point seating.

Compared with a full-size van, most minivans are based on a passenger car platform and have a lower body. Early models such as the Ford Aerostar and Chevrolet Astro utilized a compact pickup truck platform.

The largest size of minivans is also referred to as 'Large MPV' and became popular following the introduction of the 1984 Dodge Caravan and Renault Espace. Typically, these have platforms derived from D-segment passenger cars or compact pickups. Since the 1990s, the smaller compact MPV and mini MPV sizes of minivans have also become popular.

Etymology
The term minivan originated in both North America and in the United Kingdom in 1959. In the UK, Minivan referred to a small van manufactured by Austin and it was based on the newly introduced Mini car. In the US, the term was used in order to differentiate the smaller passenger vehicles from full-size vans (such as the Ford E-Series, Dodge Ram Van, and Chevrolet Van), which were then simply called 'vans'.

The first known use of the term was in 1959, but not until the 1980s was it commonly used.

Predecessors 
Before the "minivan" term, the 1936 Stout Scarab is often regarded as the first minivan. The passenger seats in the Scarab were moveable and could be configured for the passengers to sit around a table in the rear of the cabin. Passengers entered and exited the Scarab via a centrally-mounted door.

The DKW Schnellaster — manufactured from 1949 until 1962 — featured front-wheel drive, a transverse engine, flat floor and multi-configurable seating, all of which would later become characteristics of minivans.

In 1950, the Volkswagen Type 2 adapted a bus-shaped body to the chassis of a small passenger car (the Volkswagen Beetle). When Volkswagen introduced a sliding side door to the Type 2 in 1968, it then had the prominent features that would later come to define a minivan: compact length, three rows of forward-facing seats, station wagon-style top-hinged tailgate/liftgate, sliding side door, passenger car base.

The 1956–1969 Fiat Multipla also had many features in common with modern minivans. The Multipla was based on the chassis of the Fiat 600 and had a rear engine and cab forward layout.

The early 1960s saw Ford and Chevrolet introduce "compact" vans for the North American market, the Econoline Club Wagon and Greenbrier respectively. The Ford version was marketed in the Falcon series, the Chevrolet in the Corvair 95 series. The Econoline grew larger in the 1970s, while the Greenbrier was joined by (and later replaced by) the Chevy Van.

Characteristics

Chassis 
In contrast to larger vans, most modern minivans/MPVs use a front-engine, front-wheel drive layout, while some model lines offer all-wheel drive as an option. Alongside the adoption of the form factor introduced by Chrysler minivans, the configuration allows for less engine intrusion and a lower floor in the passenger compartment. In line with larger full-size vans, unibody construction has been commonly used (the spaceframe design of the Renault Espace and the General Motors APV minivans being exceptions).

Minivans/MPVs are produced on either distinct chassis architecture or share platforms with other types of vehicles such as sedans and crossover SUVs.

Body style 

Minivans/MPVs use either a two-box or a one-box body design with A, B, C and D pillars. The cabin may be fitted with two, three, or four rows of seats, with the most common configurations being 2+3+2 or 2+3+3. Compared to other types of passenger vehicles, the body shape of minivans is designed to maximize interior space for both passengers and cargo. It is achieved by lengthening the wheelbase, creating a flatter floor, taller roof, and more upright side profile, but not as prominent as commercial-oriented vans that are boxier in profile. Practicality and comfort for passengers are also enhanced with a larger rear cargo space opening and larger windows.

Some minivans/MPVs may use sliding doors while others offer conventional forward-hinged doors. Initially, a feature of the 1982 Nissan Prairie, the 1996 Chrysler minivans introduced a driver-side sliding door; by 2002, all minivans were sold with doors on both sides of the body. Most minivans are configured with a rear liftgate; few minivans have used panel-style rear doors, for example, cargo versions of the Chevrolet Astro, Ford Aerostar, and the Mercedes-Benz V-Class.

Interior 

Most minivans are designed with a reconfigurable interior to carry either passengers or cargo. The first examples were designed with removable rear seats unlatched from the floor for removal and storage (in line with larger vans); however, users gave poor reception to the design as many seats were heavy and hard to remove. In 1995, the Honda Odyssey was introduced with a third-row seat that folded flat into the floor, which was then adopted by many competitors, including Chrysler that introduced third-row and fold-flat second-row seats in 2005.

High-end minivans may include distinguished features such as captain seats or Ottoman seats, as opposed to bench seats for the second row.

North America 
Minivans developed for the North American market are distinct from most minivan/MPVs marketed in other regions such as Europe and Asia owing to their larger footprint and larger engine.

In 2021, sales of the segment totalled 310,630 units in the U.S. (2.1% of the overall car market), and 33,544 in Canada (2.0% of the overall car market). , the passenger-oriented minivan segment consists of the Toyota Sienna, Chrysler Pacifica, Chrysler Voyager, Honda Odyssey, and Kia Carnival.

History

1970s and 1980s 

In the late 1970s, Chrysler began a development program to design "a small affordable van that looked and handled more like a car." The result of this program was the first American minivans based on the S platform, the 1984 Plymouth Voyager and Dodge Caravan. The S minivans debuted the minivan design features of front-wheel drive, a flat floor and a sliding door for rear passengers.

The term minivan came into use largely in comparison to size to full-size vans; at six feet tall or lower, 1980s minivans were intended to fit inside a typical garage door opening. In 1984, The New York Times described minivans "the hot cars coming out of Detroit," noting that "analysts say the mini-van has created an entirely new market, one that may well overshadow the... station wagon."

In response to the popularity of the Voyager/Caravan, General Motors released the 1985 Chevrolet Astro and GMC Safari badge-engineered twins, and Ford released the 1986 Ford Aerostar. These vehicles used a traditional rear-wheel drive layout, unlike the Voyager/Caravan.

To match the launch of minivans by American manufacturers, Japanese manufacturers introduced the Toyota TownAce, Nissan Vanette, and Mitsubishi Delica to North America in 1984, 1986, and 1987, respectively. These vehicles were marketed with the generic "Van" and "Wagon" names (for cargo and passenger vans, respectively).

In 1989, the Mazda MPV was released as the first Japanese-brand minivan developed from the ground up specifically for the North American market. Its larger chassis allowed for the fitment of an optional V6 engine and four-wheel drive. In contrast to the sliding doors of American minivans, a hinged passenger-side door was used. A driver-side door was added for 1996, as Mazda gradually remarketed the model line as an early crossover SUV.

By the end of the 1980s, demand for minivans as family vehicles had largely superseded full-size station wagons in the United States.

1990s 

During the 1990s, the minivan segment underwent several major changes. Many models switched to the front-wheel drive layout used by the Voyager/Caravan minivans. For example, Ford replaced the Aerostar with the front-wheel drive Mercury Villager for 1993 and the Ford Windstar for 1995. The models also increased in size, as a result of the extended-wheelbase ("Grand") versions of the Voyager and Caravan which were launched in 1987. An increase in luxury features and interior equipment was seen in the Eddie Bauer version of the 1988 Ford Aerostar, the 1990 Chrysler Town & Country, and the 1990 Oldsmobile Silhouette. The third-generation Plymouth Voyager, Dodge Caravan, and Chrysler Town & Country – released for the 1996 model year – were available with an additional sliding door on the driver's side.

Following the 1990 discontinuation of the Nissan Vanette into the United States, Nissan also ended the sale of the second-generation Nissan Axxess.  Nissan reentered the segment by forming a joint venture with Ford to develop and assemble a minivan which became the Nissan Quest and its Mercury Villager counterpart.

Toyota also introduced the Toyota Previa in 1990 to replace the Van/Wagon in North America.  It was designed solely as a passenger vehicle sized to compete with American-market minivans. For 1998, the Toyota Sienna became the first Japanese-brand minivan assembled in North America, replacing the Toyota Previa in that market. For 1999, Honda introduced a separate version of the Odyssey for North America, with North America receiving a larger vehicle with sliding doors.

2000s and 2010s 

The highest selling year for minivans was in 2000, when 1.4 million units were sold. However, in the following years, sales of minivans began to decrease. In 2013, sales of the segment reached approximately 500,000, one-third of its 2000 peak. Market share of minivans in 2019 reached around 2% after a steady decline from 2004, when the segment recorded above 6% of share.  It has been suggested that the falling popularity of minivans is due to the popularity of SUVs and crossovers, and its increasingly undesirable image as a vehicle for older drivers or the soccer mom demographics.

Due to the market decline, North American sales of the Volkswagen Eurovan ceased in 2003. Ford exited the segment in 2006 when the Ford Freestar was canceled, Chrysler discontinued its short-wheelbase minivans in 2007, and General Motors exited the segment in 2009 with the cancellation of the Chevrolet Uplander. However, Volkswagen marketed the Volkswagen Routan (a rebadged Chrysler RT minivans) between 2009 and 2013. In 2010, Ford started importing the commercial-oriented Ford Transit Connect Wagon from Turkey. A similar vehicle, the Mercedes-Benz Metris entered the North American market in 2016.

The Kia Sedona, which was introduced for the 2002 model year, is notable for being the first minivan from a South Korean manufacturer in the region. For 2007, Kia also introduced the three-row Kia Rondo compact MPV, where it was prominently marketed as a crossover due to its small size and the use of hinged rear doors.

Another compact MPV released to the market was the Mazda5 in 2012, which is a three-row vehicle with rear sliding doors. Mazda claimed the model "does not fit into any traditional (North American) segmentation." The Ford C-Max was released for 2013 as a hybrid electric and battery electric compact MPV with sliding doors, although it did not offer third-row seating in North America.

Europe

In Europe, the classification is commonly known as "MPV" or "people carrier" and includes smaller vehicles with two-row seating.

History

1980s 
The 1984 Renault Espace was the first European-developed minivan developed primarily for passenger use (as the Volkswagen Caravelle/Vanagon was a derivative of a commercial van). Beginning development in the 1970s under the European subsidiaries of Chrysler, the Espace was intended as a successor for the Matra Rancho, leading to its use of front-hinged doors. While slow-selling at the time of its release, the Espace would go on to become the most successful European-brand minivans.

Initially intending to market the Espace in North America through American Motors Corporation (AMC), the 1987 sale of AMC to Chrysler canceled the plans for Renault to do so. In the late 1980s, Chrysler and Ford commenced sales of American-designed minivans in Europe (categorized as full-size in the region), selling the Chrysler Voyager and Ford Aerostar. General Motors imported the Oldsmobile Silhouette (branded as the Pontiac Trans Sport), later marketing the American-produced Opel/Vauxhall Sintra.

1990s 
In the 1990s, several joint ventures produced long-running minivan designs. In 1994, badge engeenered series of Eurovans was introduced produced by Sevel Nord and marketed by Citroën, Fiat, Lancia, and Peugeot. The Eurovans were produced with two sliding doors; to increase interior space, the gearshift was located on the dashboard and adopted a petal-type handbrake. In 1995, Ford of Europe and Volkswagen entered a joint venture, producing the Ford Galaxy, SEAT Alhambra, and Volkswagen Sharan badged vans that featured rear side doors that were front-hinged rather than sliding.

In 1996, Mercedes introduced the Mercedes-Benz V-Class, it is available as a standard panel van for cargo (called Vito), or with passenger accommodations substituted for part or all of the load area (called V-Class or Viano). In 1998, the Fiat Multipla was released. A two-row, six-seater MPV with a 3+3 seat configuration borrowing its name from an older minivan, it is notable for its highly controversial design.

Market reaction to these new full-size MPV models was mixed. Consumers perceived MPVs as large and truck-like despite boasting similar footprints as large sedans. Arguably, cultural reasons regarding vehicle size and high fuel prices were a factor. During 1996 and 1997, the Western European MPV market expanded from around 210,000 units to 350,000 units annually. However, the growth did not continue as expected, resulting in serious plant overcapacity.

Renault set a new "compact MPV" standard with the Renault Scénic in 1996 which became popular. Based on the C-segment Mégane platform, it offered the same multi-use and flexibility aspects as the larger MPVs in a much smaller footprint.

2000s 
After the success of the Renault Scénic, other makers have developed similar European-focused products such as the Opel Zafira that offered three-row seating, Citroën Xsara Picasso and others.

Asia

Japan 

Before the birth of minivans with modern form factors, tall wagon-type vehicles with large seating capacity in Japan were known as light vans. It commonly adopts mid-engine, cab over design and rear-wheel drive layout with one-box form factor. Examples included the Toyota TownAce, Toyota HiAce, Nissan Vanette, Mitsubishi Delica and Mazda Bongo. These vehicles were based on commercial vehicles, which created a gap compared to sedans in terms of ride quality and luxury.

The Nissan Prairie released in 1982 has been considered to be the first Japanese compact minivan. Derived closely from a compact sedan, the Prairie was marketed as a "boxy sedan", configured with sliding doors, folding rear seats, and a lifting rear hatch. The Mitsubishi Chariot adopted nearly the same form factor, instead using wagon-style front-hinged doors.

In 1990, Toyota introduced the Toyota Estima in Japan, which carried over the mid-engine configuration the TownAce. Along with its highly rounded exterior, the Estima was distinguished by its nearly panoramic window glass.  The Estima was redesigned in 2000, adopting a front-wheel drive layout and offered with a hybrid powertrain since 2001.  In 2002, Toyota introduced the Toyota Alphard which was developed as a luxury-oriented model.

Nissan introduced the Nissan Serena in 1990 and the Nissan Elgrand in 1997.

In 1995, Honda entered the minivan segment by introducing the Honda Odyssey.  The Odyssey was designed with front-hinged doors and as derived from the Honda Accord. As the result, it came with advantages such as sedan-like driving dynamics and a lower floor to allow for easy access.  In a design feature that would become widely adopted by other manufacturers, the Odyssey introduced a rear seat that folded flat into the floor (replacing a removable rear seat). The Odyssey evolved to become a low-roof, estate-like minivan until 2013, when it adopted a high-roof body with rear sliding doors.  Honda also produced the Honda Stepwgn mid-size MPV since 1996, which is designed with a higher cabin and narrow width, and the Honda Stream since 2002 to slot below the Odyssey.

In 2020, minivans made up 20.8% of total automobile sales in Japan behind SUVs and compact hatchbacks, making it one of the largest minivan markets in the world.

South Korea 
In South Korea, both the "minivan" and "MPV" terms are used. The Kia Carnival (also sold the Kia Sedona) was introduced in 1998 with dual sliding doors. Sharing its configuration with the Honda Odyssey, the Hyundai Trajet was sold from 1999 to 2008. Introduced in 2004, the SsangYong Rodius is the highest-capacity minivan, seating up to 11 passengers. It was discontinued in 2019.

Current minivans marketed in South Korea are the Kia Carnival and Hyundai Staria, along with imported options such as the Toyota Sienna (originally for North America) and later generations of Honda Odyssey.

China 

In 1999, Shanghai GM commenced production of the Buick GL8 minivan, derived from a minivan platform designed by GM in the United States. After two generations of production, the GL8 is the final minivan produced by General Motors or its joint ventures today. It remained dominant in the high-end minivan segment in the market.

Sales of minivans in China increased rapidly in 2015 and 2016, when the Chinese government lifted the one-child policy in favor of the two-child policy which pushed customer preference toward three-row vehicles in anticipation of a larger family. In 2016, 2,497,543 minivans were sold in China, a major increase from 2012 which recorded 936,232 sales. However, sales volume had shrunk ever since, with only 1,082,028 minivans sold in the domestic market in 2021 (4.1% of the total car market), around 720,000 of which were sold by domestic manufacturers.

Indonesia 
The MPV segment is the most popular passenger car segment in Indonesia with a market share of 40 percent in 2021.

India 
The category is commonly known as multi utility vehicle (MUV) or MPV. In fiscal year 2020, sales volume of the segment totalled 283,583 vehicles, or 10.3% of industry total.

Size categories

Mini MPV 

Mini MPV – an abbreviation for Mini Multi-Purpose Vehicle – is a vehicle size class for the smallest size of minivans (MPVs). The Mini MPV size class sits below the compact MPV size class and the vehicles are often built on the platforms of B-segment hatchback models.

Several minivans based on B-segment platforms have been marketed as 'leisure activity vehicles' in Europe. These include the Fiat Fiorino and Ford Transit Courier.

Examples:

Compact MPV 

Compact MPV – an abbreviation for Compact Multi-Purpose Vehicle – is a vehicle size class for the middle size of MPVs/minivans. The Compact MPV size class sits between the mini MPV and minivan size classes.

Compact MPVs remain predominantly a European phenomenon, although they are also built and sold in many Latin American and Asian markets. As of 2016, the only compact MPV sold widely in the United States was the Ford C-Max.

Examples:

Related categories

Leisure activity vehicle 

A leisure activity vehicle (abbreviated LAV), also known as van-based MPV and ludospace in French, is the passenger-oriented version of small commercial vans primarily marketed in Europe. One of the first LAVs was the 1977 Matra Rancho (among the first crossover SUVs and a precursor to the Renault Espace), with European manufacturers expanding the segment in the late 1990s, following the introduction of the Citroën Berlingo and Renault Kangoo.

Leisure activity vehicles are typically derived from supermini or subcompact car platforms, differing from mini MPVs in body design. To maximize interior space, LAVs feature a taller roof, more upright windshield, and longer hood/bonnet with either a liftgate or barn doors to access the boot. Marketed as an alternative to sedan-derived small family cars, LAVs have seating with a lower H-point than MPVs or minivans, offering two (or three) rows of seating.

Though sharing underpinnings with superminis, subcompacts, and mini MPVs, the use of an extended wheelbase can make leisure activity vehicles longer than the vehicles they are derived from.

Asian utility vehicle 

An Asian utility vehicle (abbreviated AUV) is a term originating from the Philippines to describe basic and affordable vehicles with either large seating capacity or cargo designed to be sold in developing countries. These vehicles are usually available in minivan-like wagon body style with a seating capacity of 7 to 16 passengers, and are usually based on a compact pickup truck with body-on-frame chassis and rear-wheel drive to maximize its load capacity and durability while maintaining low manufacturing cost. Until the 2000s, AUVs were popular in Southeast Asia, particularly in Indonesia and the Philippines, Taiwan, and some African markets.

The first AUV is the Toyota Tamaraw/Kijang, which was introduced in the Philippines and Indonesia since 1975 as a pickup truck with optional rear cabin. In the 1990s, other vehicles such as the Isuzu Panther/Hi-Lander/Crosswind and Mitsubishi Freeca/Adventure/Kuda emerged in the AUV segment. Modern equivalent of AUV is the Toyota Innova, an MPV that is the direct successor to the Kijang which in its first two generations were built with body-on-frame construction. The third generation of the vehicle switched to unibody construction.

Three-row SUV 

With the decline of the minivan/MPV category in many regions such as North America and Europe in the mid-2010s, SUVs and crossovers with three rows of seating became popular alternatives. Compared to minivans, three-row SUVs lose sliding doors and generally offer less interior space due to the higher priorities on exterior styling and higher ground clearance.

References

Further media

 Videos